Technical Teachers’ Training College is an institute for the training of teachers for public technical and polytechnic colleges in Bangladesh and is located in Dhaka, Bangladesh.

Location 
The capital is located at 95, Shaheed Taj Uddin Ahmed Sarani, Tejgaon Industrial Area. To the north is Dhaka Polytechnic Institute, Bangladesh University of Textiles, to the west is Dhaka-Tongi Highway.

History
The establishment of the Technical Teachers Training College (TTTC) dates back to 1960 as the teachers’ wing of the Dhaka Polytechnic Institute. It underwent rapid growth and development and in 1964 emerged as a separate college called the Technical Education College (TEC). In 1967 the college was renamed the Technical Teachers Training College.

In 1981, with opening of a separate Engineering College (Presently Dhaka University of Engineering) on the campus of TTTC it suffered a break in its activities. TTTC was reborn in 1986 with renewed philosophy and naturally with activities in tune with modern trends in the arena of training of the technical teachers internationally. TTTC owes it growth and development since its rebirth mostly to the technical assistance provided by ODA (UK). It is under the Directorate of Technical Education of the Ministry of Education.

Department
 Electrical & Electronics Engineering
 Mechanical Engineering
 Civil Engineering
 Non Tech Department

Degrees offered
1. Diploma in Technical Education under Bangladesh Technical Education Board

2. B.Sc. in Technical Education under University of Dhaka

Dormitory and quarters 

 Technical Teachers' Training College (TTTC) Officer's Quarter
 Students Dormitory

References

Research institutes in Bangladesh
1967 establishments in Pakistan
Teacher training colleges in Bangladesh
Universities and colleges in Dhaka